Dorian Trevor Thompson-Robinson (born November 14, 1999), also known by his initials DTR, is an American football quarterback for the UCLA Bruins. He has been a two-time second-team all-conference selection in the Pac-12 (2020, 2021).

Early years
Thompson-Robinson was born on November 14, 1999 in Columbia, South Carolina. He attended Bishop Gorman High School in Las Vegas, Nevada. A four-star recruit, Thompson-Robinson passed for 3,275 passing yards and 38 touchdowns as a senior, and he also rushed for 426 yards and 7 touchdowns. He committed to the University of California, Los Angeles to play college football, choosing the Bruins over Michigan.

College career

2018 season
Thompson-Robinson saw action in ten games in 2018, his freshman season at UCLA. Of those ten games, he took the first offensive snap in seven. In a 31–24 loss to No. 10 Washington on October 6, Thompson-Robinson completed 27 of 38 passes for 272 yards and two touchdowns. The following week, on October 13, Thompson-Robinson completed 13 of 15 passes in a 37–7 victory over California for an 86.6% completion percentage. This was third-highest completion percentage by a UCLA quarterback since 1980 in a game with at least 15 passes.

2019 season
Thompson-Robinson became the starting quarterback in 2019, his sophomore season. He started 11 of the 12 games that season, missing the Oregon State game with an injury. On September 21, Thompson-Robinson led the Bruins to a 67–63 comeback victory at No. 19 Washington State. Against the Cougars, Thompson-Robinson threw for 507 yards and five touchdowns, and he also ran for 57 yards and two touchdowns in the victory. His 564 total yards against Washington State was a UCLA record for total offense by a player in a game. In the Bruins' rivalry matchup against USC on November 23, Thompson-Robinson generated 431 yards of total offense against the Trojans, which was the second-most ever by a Bruin in the UCLA–USC rivalry and the ninth-best single-game performance in UCLA history.

In 2019, Thompson-Robinson amassed 2,701 passing yards and 198 rushing yards for a total of 2,899 yards of offense—the tenth-most for a UCLA player in a single season. His 25 touchdowns—21 in the air and four on the ground—also ranked tenth all-time in a single season for a UCLA player.

2020 season
Thompson-Robinson was once again named the starting quarterback for the 2020 season, which was delayed and shortened by the COVID-19 pandemic. In a season-opening 48–42 loss at Colorado, Thompson-Robinson completed 20 of 40 passes for 303 yards and four passing touchdowns and one interception. He also rushed for 109 yards, which included a 65-yard touchdown run in the third quarter. Thompson-Robinson's performance in the Colorado game made him the first Bruin ever to pass for 300 yards and run for 100 yards in a game.

Statistically, Thompson-Robinson saw a significant improvement over his sophomore season. He completed 65.2 percent of his passes for 12 touchdowns and four interceptions, and he also ran for 306 yards and three touchdowns. In the Bruins' December 12 matchup with No. 15 USC, Thompson-Robinson completed 83.3 percent of his passes for 364 passing yards, four touchdowns, and two interceptions. He also ran for 50 yards against the Trojans. He was named second-team All-Pac-12.

2021 season
On December 21, 2020, Thompson-Robinson announced on Twitter that he would return to UCLA for the 2021 season. He again earned second-team all-conference honors from Pac-12 coaches, finishing with 2,409 yards passing and 21 passing touchdowns, which ranked second in the conference. He was named first-team All-Pac-12 by the Associated Press.

2022 season
On January 10, 2022, Thompson-Robinson announced on Twitter that he would return for a fifth season. The NCAA had granted all 2020 fall athletes an additional year of eligibility as a result of the COVID-19 pandemic.

In Thompson-Robinson's season debut against Bowling Green, he completed 32 of 43 passes for 298 yards, two touchdowns, and one interception. In the same game, he also rushed for 87 yards and two touchdowns, one of which was a 68-yard touchdown run in the first quarter.

College career statistics
Stats current as of November 26, 2022.

Personal life
Thompson-Robinson's parents are Michael Robinson and Dr. Melva Thompson-Robinson, a public health professor at UNLV. He has one brother and one sister.

References

External links
UCLA Bruins bio

1999 births
Living people
Sportspeople from Las Vegas
Players of American football from Columbia, South Carolina
Players of American football from Nevada
African-American players of American football
American football quarterbacks
UCLA Bruins football players
21st-century African-American sportspeople